Glenea balteata is a species of beetle in the family Cerambycidae. It was described by Johann Christoph Friedrich Klug in 1835. It is known from the Democratic Republic of the Congo, São Tomé and Príncipe, and Cameroon.

References

balteata
Beetles described in 1835